BT Mobile is a mobile virtual network operator (MVNO) provided by BT Consumer; a division of BT Group in the United Kingdom that was launched in March 2015. It uses the EE network via an MVNO agreement signed in March 2014 as well as using the spectrum BT won in the 2013 4G auction. EE is now owned by BT following a successful acquisition that was officially completed on 29 January 2016. BT Mobile operates alongside BT Business Mobile which is provided by the BT Business and Public Sector division. BT Mobile launched as a SIM-only service and had more than 400,000 customers as of 5 May 2016.

Products

SIM-only plans

BT Mobile is a full fledged mobile service with handsets and sim only offers four 12-month contract plans as of 7 November 2020:

 BT Mobile 500MB Plan - 500MB of data, 500 minutes and unlimited texts
 BT Mobile 10GB Plan - 10GB of data, 1000 minutes and unlimited texts
 BT Mobile 16GB Plan - 16GB of data, unlimited minutes and texts
 BT Mobile 20GB Plan - 20GB of data, unlimited minutes and texts 
 BT Mobile 30GB Plan - 30GB of data, unlimited minutes and texts 
 BT Mobile 100GB - 100GB of data, unlimited minutes and texts
Anyone living in a BT Broadband home are eligible for a £5 monthly discount on all BT Mobile plans - each account holder can have up to five discounted plans but there's no limit to the number of people in a house that can take up the offer.

Features

BT Sport

Subscribers to BT Mobile can watch BT Sport through the dedicated mobile streaming app.  However, watching BT Sport via television still requires a paid subscription.

BT Wi-Fi

Subscribers to BT Mobile have unlimited access to BT Wi-Fi, regardless of the data allowance in their contract.  Connection to BT Wi-Fi can be made through an internet browser or the dedicated BT Wi-Fi application.

BT Mobile App
The BT Mobile app allows a subscriber to keep on top of their contract allowance, allowing them to see their minutes, texts and remaining data allowance.  The app also shows outwith contract spending, details of the consumers contract and information on data roaming.

Services

Network
BT Mobile offers 4G as standard to all customers at no extra cost and in order to benefit from 4G speeds, a 4G-ready phone is required. However, customers in areas with no 4G coverage or without a 4G-ready phone will still be able to connect via the 3G and 2G networks.

Coverage
As BT Mobile uses the EE network, its 4G network reaches more than 95% of the UK population while its 3G network reaches 98% and 2G network reaches 99%.

Extra Speed 4G
On 3 February 2016, BT announced a new add-on service called Extra Speed 4G for BT Mobile customers, allowing them to access even faster upload and download speeds than standard 4G, provided they are in an Extra Speed 4G area. The speeds can reach a maximum of up to 60Mbit/s and the service costs £4 a month and is a 30-day rolling contract, which means customers won't be tied in for 12 months. The speed will vary on a day-to-day basis and depends on various things such as coverage, distance from the mast, the number of people using the network and the type of 4G phone you have, as well as whether you're indoors or in a densely populated area.

Wi-Fi Calling
BT introduced Wi-Fi Calling on 29 March 2018, which allows customers to use Wi-Fi to call and text in areas with poor or no signal, and will come out of their monthly minutes and texts allowance or at the normal network rate, with no extra charge. It works on any Apple handset from iPhone 5S onwards and certain Android handsets bought from BT Mobile. For existing customers, BT's 'My BT' and BT Mobile app offer the ability to check phone compatibility. The phone's software must be updated to take benefit of the service, minimum iOS 11.3 or later for Apple handsets.

4G Calling
BT introduced 4G Calling (VoLTE) on 29 March 2018, which allows customers to make calls over 4G and can continue to use 4G data as they talk. It works on any Apple handset from iPhone 6 onwards and certain Android handsets bought from BT Mobile. For existing customers, BT's 'My BT' and BT Mobile app offer the ability to check phone compatibility. The phone's software must be updated to take benefit of the service, minimum iOS 11.3 or later for Apple handsets.

Voicemail
BT Mobile automatically diverts all unanswered calls to voicemail. Customers will receive a text from BT when a voicemail is left. It uses the same voicemail code - 1571 as BT's fixed lines.

Parental Controls
BT Mobile offers free parental controls to limit what a user can access via the internet such as blocking inappropriate content.

See also
 EE Limited

References

External links
BT Mobile Official Website

Mobile virtual network operators
BT Group